Rupert Williams Haggen (July 29, 1887 – July 19, 1962) was a Canadian politician, who represented the electoral district of Grand Forks-Greenwood in the Legislative Assembly of British Columbia from 1949 to 1956. He was a member of the Co-operative Commonwealth Federation.

He was born in New Zealand and came to Canada in 1901. Haggen finished his education, qualifying as an engineer and was hired by the Canadian Pacific Railway. From 1909 to 1934, he practised as a mining and civil engineer. He also was qualified as a Dominion and B.C. Land Surveyor and served as president of the B.C. Land Surveyors' Association. In 1935, he moved to the Kootenay region, settling in Rossland. Later, Haggen became a notary public, opening offices in Rossland, Grand Forks and Kelowna.

He retired from politics in 1956 due to health problems and was succeeded by his wife, Lois Haggen, the former Lois Hill.

He died in Grand Forks at the age of 74.

References

1962 deaths
British Columbia Co-operative Commonwealth Federation MLAs
20th-century Canadian politicians
1887 births
People from Napier, New Zealand
New Zealand emigrants to Canada